Deepak Das (born 1 February 1965) is former Indian first-class cricketer. He played  17 first-class matches for Assam. Das was a right-handed batsman and a right-arm offbreak bowler.

References

External links
 

1965 births
Living people
Indian cricketers
Assam cricketers
Cricketers from Guwahati
Cricketers from Assam